Free is the second studio album by English rock band Free, recorded and released in 1969. The band had spent time touring their debut album Tons of Sobs (1969) the previous year, and there is a marked difference in the musicianship of the band as well as Paul Rodgers's voice. Both albums were released by Island Records, with Free being produced by Chris Blackwell, the head of Island, taking over from Guy Stevens, who produced the first album.

Recording
This album saw the burgeoning of the songwriting partnership, glimpsed on Tons of Sobs with songs such as "I'm a Mover", between Paul Rodgers and 16-year-old bassist Andy Fraser; here, eight of the nine tracks bear a Fraser/Rodgers credit. Fraser's bass guitar is far more prominent than on the previous album, being used as a rhythm guitar to drive the songs, while Kossoff's lead guitar develops from it.

While Fraser and Rodgers made a strong writing partnership, tensions in the band increased. Kossoff, whose natural spontaneity had until then been given free rein, particularly resented being taught specific rhythm guitar parts by Fraser. But Blackwell managed to keep the band in line to record the album.

The album performed poorly, failing to chart in the UK and in the US.  The single releases, "Broad Daylight" and "I'll be Creepin'", also failed.  Two songs from the album, "I'll be Creepin'" and "Woman", were later covered by the American rock band Three Dog Night.

Cover
The album is notable for having innovative artwork from Ron Raffaelli of The Visual Thing Inc. It is featured in the book 100 Best Album Covers alongside better-known examples such as Peter Blake's cover for the Beatles' Sgt. Pepper's Lonely Hearts Club Band (1967) and Robert Crumb's artwork for Big Brother and the Holding Company's Cheap Thrills (1968). The book was part compiled by Storm Thorgerson, who had designed many famous album covers such as Pink Floyd's The Dark Side of the Moon (1973).

Raffaelli made the cover by photographing his model with strobe lights to make a silhouette of her against a background, on which he could then overlay the design. Hence, the album has a design of a woman made of stars leaping across the sky. The band's name is printed in extremely small letters at the top of the cover; with CDs being much smaller than LPs, this is almost unreadable.

Track listing
All tracks written by Andy Fraser and Paul Rodgers unless otherwise noted.

Side one
 "I'll Be Creepin'" – 3:27
 "Songs of Yesterday" – 3:33
 "Lying in the Sunshine" – 3:51
 "Trouble on Double Time" (Fraser, Rodgers, Simon Kirke, Paul Kossoff) – 3:23
 "Mouthful of Grass" – 3:36
Side two
 "Woman" – 3:50
 "Free Me" – 5:24
 "Broad Daylight" – 3:15
 "Mourning Sad Morning" – 5:04

Extra tracks
 "Broad Daylight" – 3.09
The version of the song that was released as a single, this is a slightly different edit and features prominent backing singers.
 "The Worm" – 3.03
This was the B-side to "Broad Daylight".
 "I'll Be Creepin'" – 2.47
This is the single version of the album track, with one verse edited out.
 "Sugar for Mr. Morrison" – 3.01
The band's second instrumental track, this is a slow, bass-driven number that gradually builds into a crashing guitar jam. It was released as the B-side to "I'll Be Creepin'".
 "Broad Daylight" (BBC Session) – 3.21
A BBC Session of the album track recorded on 17 March 1969.
 "Songs of Yesterday" (BBC Session) – 3.11
A BBC Session of the album track recorded on 17 March 1969.
 "Mouthful of Grass" – 3.33
This early version of the song contains only the rhythm guitar (played by Fraser) which formed the backbone of the finished song.
 "Woman" – 4.00
This is an alternate version of the album track, with less prominent guitar.
 "Trouble on Double Time" – 2.37
An early version of the album track
 "Mourning Sad Morning" – 5.10
This is an alternate version of the album track that does not contain Wood's flute solo.

Personnel
 Paul Rodgers – lead vocals
 Paul Kossoff – lead guitar
 Andy Fraser – bass guitar, rhythm guitar, acoustic guitar, piano
 Simon Kirke – drums, percussion
 Chris Wood – flute on "Mourning sad Morning"

References
Citations

Sources
 Strong, Martin C. The Great Rock Discography, 6th edition. Edinburgh: Canongate Books 1994, 2002. pp. 392–3.
 Sutcliffe, Phil. Notes to Free by Free. Universal Island Records Ltd. 1969, 2001.
 Thorgerson, Storm and Aubrey Powell. 100 Best Album Covers. London: Dorling Kindersley 1994.

External links 
 Free - Free (1969) album review by Dave Thompson, credits & releases at AllMusic
 Free - Free (1969) album releases & credits at Discogs
 Free (Remastered 2001 + Extra Tracks) on Spotify

1969 albums
A&M Records albums
Albums produced by Chris Blackwell
Albums recorded at Trident Studios
Free (band) albums
Island Records albums